Lemeshko is a Ukrainian surname. Notable people with the surname include:

 Liubomyr Lemeshko (born 1992), Ukrainian swimmer
 Lyudmyla Lemeshko (born 1979), Ukrainian footballer
 Sergei Lemeshko (1972–2016), Russian footballer
 Yevhen Lemeshko (1930–2016), Ukrainian footballer

See also
 

Ukrainian-language surnames